Jorge Artajo Muruzabal (born 14 October 1952) is a Spanish visual artist, draftsman, writer, performer and social activist.

Biography 
Muruzabal was born in Sádaba, (Zaragoza). Graduate in Media Studies and Communications by the Complutense University (Universidad Complutense) in Madrid. He was arrested several times in 1970 and 1972 during Franco's dictatorship when demonstrating in several campaigns against political repression and for Amnesty and Freedom, and was confined from several months at the Carabanchel Prison (cárcel de Carabanchel) in Madrid. As a painter and draftsman he has a great diversity of themes and stiles: From naive and colourful paintings to very dark drawings.

Illustrated books 
 Máscaras, Imágenes, proverbios y palabras. Carlos Rodriguez. 1974.
 De qué va la alimentación natural. Rosa Sola Franch. 1977 
 Somnis. Comediants. 1987 
 La Nit. Comediants. 1987 
 Prendas íntimas. Ana Rossetti. 1989 
 Virgo Potens. Ana Rossetti. 1989.
 La aventura de Sir Karel de Nortumbria. Manuel Alfonseca. 1990 
 La noche no es hermosa. Terenci Moix. 1994 
 Las bodas reales. Ana Rossetti. 2006. 
 Buenos días Sr. Hoy. Ana Rossetti. 2007.

Book covers 

 Soc Llegenda. Richard Matheson. 1988. 
 Historias fantásticas. Stephen King. 1990. 
 La danza de la muerte. Stephen King. 1990. 
 El hijo de la noche infinita. John Farris. 1990
  La veu melodiosa. Montserrat Roig. 1990.

Shows and exhibitions 
  COGAM  Madrid
  Teatre Lliure. Barcelona

Performances 
  Virgo Potens y las ánimas (Virgo Potens and the souls). With Ana Rossetti
  La búsqueda de Diógenes nos 1 y 2 (Diogenes Search # 1 & 2)

External links
 Jorge Artajo in Myspace
 Obra Writings on the Wall en la Rikhardinkatu Library de Helsinki

References 

1952 births
20th-century Spanish painters
20th-century Spanish male artists
Spanish male painters
21st-century Spanish painters
21st-century Spanish male artists
Spanish poets
Living people
Complutense University of Madrid alumni
People from Cinco Villas, Aragon
Spanish male poets